Jand Awan is a village and union council, an administrative subdivision, of Chakwal District in the Punjab Province of Pakistan, it is part of Chakwal Tehsil.

Lt Gen Abdul Majeed Malik

References

Union councils of Chakwal District
Populated places in Chakwal District

return 0;